Picture This – The Essential Blondie Collection is a compilation album of recordings by the band Blondie released by EMI in 1998. It contains a selection of album tracks, singles, one b-side, one demo and two remixes taken from 1995 remix compilation Beautiful: The Remix Album. Track listing of this compilation is almost the same as the previous Blondie compilation Denis.

Track listing

References

1998 compilation albums
Blondie (band) compilation albums
EMI Records compilation albums